was a town located in Chiisagata District, Nagano Prefecture, Japan.

As of 2003, the town had an estimated population of 25,050 and a density of 236.99 persons per km². The total area was 105.70 km².

On March 6, 2006, Maruko, along with the old city of Ueda, the town of Sanada, and the village of Takeshi (all from Chiisagata District), to create the new and expanded city of Ueda.

Maruko is home to several hot-springs, the most famous being Kakeyu Onsen.

External links
 Official website of Ueda 

Dissolved municipalities of Nagano Prefecture
Ueda, Nagano